Rockweed may refer to:
 Ascophyllum nodosum, a seaweed also known as knotted wrack or Norwegian kelp
 Fucus gardneri, a similar seaweed also known as bladderwrack
 Fucus vesiculosus, a similar seaweed also known as bladderwrack
 Pilea microphylla, a vascular plant native to Florida
 Silvetia, a common brown seaweed of Pacific Ocean rocky seashores